Fox in Socks is a children's book by Dr. Seuss, first published in 1965. It features two main characters, Fox (an anthropomorphic fox) who speaks almost entirely in densely rhyming tongue-twisters and Knox (a yellow anthropomorphic dog) who has a hard time following up Fox's tongue-twisters until the end.

Storyline
The book begins by introducing Fox and Knox along with some props (a box and a pair of socks). After taking those four rhyming items through several permutations, more items are added (chicks, bricks, blocks, clocks), and so on. As the book progresses, Fox describes each situation with rhymes that progress in complexity, with Knox periodically complaining about the difficulty of the tongue-twisters. Finally, as Fox gives Knox an extended dissertation on "Tweetle Beetles" who fight each other with paddles while standing in a puddle inside a bottle on a noodle-eating poodle, a fed-up Knox interrupts and pushes him into the bottle, calling it a "tweetle beetle noodle poodle bottled paddled muddled duddled fuddled wuddled fox in socks". He then thanks an astonished Fox for all the "fun" and takes leave.

Reception
Kirkus Reviews considered it an "amusing exercise for beginning readers", but noted that the tongue-twisters made little sense when removed from the context of their illustrations.

In 1996, Publishers Weekly noted that it was the 25th-best-selling hardcover children's book of all time, with 2.95M copies sold.

Adaptations
The tweetle beetle skit was featured in The Hoober-Bloob Highway, a 1975 CBS television special. Here, the skit was part of a job: that of a "famous tweetle beetle statistician. If you took on this job, you could be the world's greatest authority on tweetle beetle battlistics, if you study tweetle beetles and their ballistic characteristics". It ended by cutting back to the base, with Mr. Hoober-Bloob waving his arms around, covering his ears, and yelling, "Stop it! Stop it! I can't stand it! That world is a vastly cruddy, bloody bore!"

In 1965, the book was adapted as a record, narrated by Marvin Miller with music by Marty Gold and his orchestra. The album starts off with a slow reading of the book, followed by a faster reading.

The entire book was translated by the Israeli author and lyricist Leah Na'or into Hebrew as "בא עם גרבים" (Ba Im Garba'im, literally "He Came With Socks"). Some emendations were made to the original text for better rhyming; for example, Knox's name, in this version, is "ברגז" (Bargaz), to rhyme with "ארגז" (argaz, meaning box), and the chicks in the beginning of the book became ducks. Occasionally the translator wrote a new tongue-twister to fit the existing artwork; the entire poem about the cheese trees, for instance, was replaced with an entirely new poem about an elephant who tripped and fell on his nose. This version of the book was published in 1980 by Keter Publications in Jerusalem.

References

1965 children's books
American picture books
Children's poetry books
Books about foxes
Literature featuring anthropomorphic foxes
Socks
Books by Dr. Seuss
Random House books
Tongue-twisters